Cramel is an Israeli children's book series by , illustrated by Keren Mai Metcalfe (books 1–4) and Rami Tal (books 5-present). As of December 2022, the series has sold over 300,000 copies. On December 20, 2022, the 7th book in the series "Danger in the Swamp" was released.

Premise 
A woman named Mila adopts three orphans: Robbie (Robert), El El (Elliot) and Gol (Gabriel). One morning, they receive a mysterious package from their uncle Arthur Jerome who informs them that he has passed away and divided his inheritance into three gold rings. El El chooses the Ring of Happiness, which grants him Jerome's castle and all 500 of its servants. Gol chooses the Ring of Industry, which grants him all three of his uncle's factories. Robbie chooses the Nameless Ring and it grants him Arthur's cat, Cramel. Two of the rings have restrictions: El El must live with Mila and his brothers until Robbie turns 18 and Gol will only get the factories at 18. Nonetheless, Robbie receives no warnings or rules. When they move to the castle, they discover that the housemaster, Mimi Bloom and her daughter Helena live there and cannot be fired due to an intervention set up by Arthur many years ago. Robbie discovers that the cat, Cramel, can talk and hides his other abilities from Robbie, such as: mind reading, turning stone into gold, invisibility and more. Mimi and Helena try to steal the three brothers' inheritance, focusing especially on the cat.

Reception 
Overall, the book received praise. Critics noted the resemblance to Roald Dahl's books and the feelings evoked by the story "with the scent of the past ... along with important lessons about true friendship, courage, self-belief and true love."

Events 
From August 8 to 26, the Dizengoff Center hosted attractions promoting the Cramel book and TV series. The attraction was planned to take place despite the recent Gaza–Israel clashes. The attractions included: cat adoption, workshops with Cramel book illustrator , story time with actor and voice-actor Tomer Sharon, an activity and creative complex with activity booklets and riddles, Daily prize-bearing quizzes compiled by the author, and a cat themed cake-making contest.

Adaptations

TV Series 

The books were adapted into a television series also titled "Cramel", with its first season airing on Kan Educational in January 2022. A second season is expected to air in late January or early February 2023.

Comic Book 
It takes place when Cramel is still a kitten.

Musical 
On Hanukkah, December 19, 2022, a musical inspired by the Cramel book series had its first showing at the Orna Porat Children's Theater and was released concurrently with the 7th book. The release was paired with an opportunity to get Barnea-Goldberg's signature and partake in a communal menorah lighting.

Awards 

References 

Hebrew-language books
Children's fiction books